Chico Alvarez may refer to:

Alfred "Chico" Alvarez (1920–1992), Canadian trumpeter and session musician with Stan Kenton
Chico Álvarez (singer) (born Ernesto Álvarez Peraza), American Latin jazz musician
Bryan Alvarez (born 1975), American newsletter editor and professional wrestler under the name Chico Alvarez